Jacobus tenBroek (1911-1968) was an American disability rights activist.

Early life
TenBroek was born in Alberta, Canada in 1911. He was partially blind at the age of 7 due to an accident with a bow and arrow. His remaining eyesight deteriorated and he was completely blind by age 14. His mother decided to move the family to California so tenBroek could attend a state school for the blind.

In 1934, tenBroek graduated from the University of California with a degree in history. He graduated with the highest honors. He went on to earn a master's degree in political science and a Bachelor of Laws and Doctor of Juridical Science degree from University of California Berkeley School of Law. He continued to review honors after graduation. He was on the California Law Review, a member of the Order of the Coif, and earned a Brandeis Research Fellowship with Harvard University.

Career
TenBroek served on the faculty of the Chicago Law School. California Governor Earl Warren appointed tenBroek to the California Social Welfare Board. During 1960-63 of his tenure on the Board, he was chairman. During his career, he published over fifty articles. His book, Prejudice, War and the Constitution, received the Woodrow Wilson Award. He was with the University of California at Berkeley for 25 years, from 1942 until his death. During that time, he became full professor in 1953 and chairman of the department of speech in 1955.

Activism
During his career, he focused on subjects that were not yet being written about by scholars. He brought attention to the field of welfare and raised awareness to the deprived citizens in society. He wrote scholarly material about the origins of the Thirteenth Amendment and the Fourteenth Amendment to the United States Constitution. His book, The Antislavery Origins of the Fourteenth Amendment was cited by Thurgood Marshall in the Brown v. Board of Education case and regularly cited by the United States Department of Justice. His writings affected much scholarship and attention around civil rights law and welfare rights law.

In 1934, he worked with a few others to organize the California Council of the Blind. In 1940 he began organizing the National Federation of the Blind. He later began organizing the International Federation of the Blind in 1964.

He stood for academic freedom and opposed the loyalty oath in the 1950s.

His 1958 book critiqued the Supreme Court's decision regarding the imprisonment of Japanese Americans during World War II.

TenBroek was supportive of the Free Speech Movement, which was a student protest taking place on the University of California Berkeley campus, to support the freedom of students to protest or host other political activities on campus.

TenBroek wrote in his 1966 article "The Right to Live in the World:  The Disabled in the Law of Torts", that the doctrines in the law of torts ought to be reviewed and revised to address the modern societal integration of disabled people into society.

tenBroek Papers
Throughout his life, tenBroek collected documentation about the early history of the National Federation of the Blind and the blind civil rights movement. After his death, his wife continued collecting papers for the collection, which is now housed at the Jacobus tenBroek Library within the Jernigan Institute. Research specialist at the Jacobus tenBroek Library, Lou Ann Blake, catalogued the collection. Printed, the collection took up thirty-five four-drawer file cabinets and four two-drawer file cabinets. Some of the more important documents are now archived in a temperature- and humidity-controlled room within the Jernigan Institute. Scholars have visited the collection to research activists in the blind civil rights movement, including Isabelle Grant and the first executive director of the National Federation of the Blind, Raymond Henderson. Some of the papers are personal correspondence of tenBroek with family, friends, jurists, authors, politicians, and members of Congress.

Personal life
In 1937, tenBroek married Hazel Feldheym. Later, Feldheym served as associate editor of the journal the Braille Monitor. Together tenBroek and Feldheym had three children: Jacobus Zivnuska, Anna Carlotta (Hammond), and Nicolaas Perry.

Death
TenBroek passed away from cancer on March 27, 1968, at the age of 56.

Publications

Books
tenBroek, J. (1951). The Antislavery Origins of the Fourteenth Amendment. University of California Press.
tenBroek, J., Barnhart, E.N., & Matson, F.W. (1958). Japanese American Evacuation and Resettlement Prejudice, War and the Constitution. University of California.
tenBroek, J. (1959). Hope Deferred: Public Welfare and the Blind.
tenBroek, J. (1964). California's Dual System of Family Law.
tenBroek, J. (1965). Equal Under Law. Collier Books.
tenBroek, J., Barnhart, E.N., & Matson, F.W. (1970). Prejudice, War and the Constitution: Causes and Consequences of the Evacuation of the Japanese Americans in World War II. University of California Press.

Articles
tenBroek, J. (1966). The Right to Live in the World:  The Disabled in the Law of Torts. California Law Review: 54(2).

References

UC Berkeley School of Law alumni
Canadian blind people
American disability rights activists
1911 births
1968 deaths
Canadian disability rights activists
Activists from Alberta
Activists from California
Canadian emigrants to the United States
University of Chicago Law School faculty
University of California, Berkeley faculty
California lawyers
20th-century American lawyers
Blind academics